Kye Kye (stylized KYE KYE) is an American indietronica band from Portland, Oregon, that formed in 2010. The band is made up of Estonian-born Yagolnikov siblings Olga and Timothy. They released their first studio album in 2011 entitled Young Love that was released independently by the band. The band got more success commercially and critically out of their second LP entitled Fantasize that released in early 2014 by Valga Records, which is an independent record label.

History
The band started in 2010, its original members the three Yagolnikov siblings Olga on lead vocals and guitar, Alex on keyboards, and Timothy on programming, keyboards and guitar, and Olga's husband Thomas Phelan on the drums. The band are self-professed Christians, but they do not consider their music to be "Christian music".

In 2011, the band released their first album, Young Love, independently.

Fantasize 
They released their second studio album entitled Fantasize on January 21, 2014. For the Billboard charting week of February 8, 2014, the album charted at Nos. 7 and 50 on the Top Heatseekers Albums and Independent Albums charts. The album was met with positive reviews from CCM Magazine, Knoxville News Sentinel, and Indie Vision Music.

Members
Current members
 Olga Yagolnikov Phelan – vocals, guitar
 Timothy Yagolnikov – programming, keyboards, guitar

Former members
 Thomas Phelan - drums
 Alex Yagolnikov - keyboards

Discography
Studio albums

References

External links
 
 World magazine article
 Relevant interview
 The Blue Indian interview

Musical groups established in 2010
2010 establishments in Washington (state)
People from Clark County, Washington
Musical groups from Washington (state)